Women for Afghan Women, also known as WAW, is the largest non-government Afghan women's rights organization in the world, founded in April 2001. It is dedicated to protecting the rights of Afghan women and girls. The staff are mostly Afghans and WAW adopts a community-based approach. For example, they conduct educational workshops about women's rights according to Islamic law.

WAW was co-founded by Sunita Viswanath, who was also chair of the board for some time.

Viswanath co-wrote an open letter to the board in April 2022, after her resignation.

Raising awareness 
The centre teaches men and women about respecting women's rights which are in tandem with basic human rights. WAW have in place an outreach and awareness program whereby people of Afghanistan can attend, to learn more about the less harsh version of Islam than what they have been previously taught by ultraconservative individuals who may have malicious intents or by men who are chauvinists by nature. WAW sends staff out to reach out to the elusive women who are in abusive relationships and are afraid to seek help. WAW also reaches out to the community by visiting schools and police stations, with the hope to encourage Afghans to attend the awareness centre. To date, the centre has successfully educated thousands of Afghans including imams (religious leaders) and law enforcement officials with regards to women's right in the context of Islamic law. Their biggest mission is to offer security and liberty  for the women in Afghan. Another goal for them is to encourage them to inflate their self-esteem, and also to participate in all area of life: social, economic, and politics. "Our work is strengthened by our commitment to diversity. Their board and staff consists men and women and a diverse representation of age, religion, ethnicity and sexual orientation".

Shelter home 
WAW has opened eight family guidance centres (FGC). A facility opened to both men and women who had their human rights violated, including domestic violence, sexual and mental violence, forced and underage marriage, being exchanged as compensation for a crime, honor killings, and being denied education. It is a walk-in centre, though most clients are referred by government ministries, the police, the Independent Human Rights Commission, or other NGOs.

For cases that bring physical danger to the women, including risk of physical violence and death, they are sent to one of the seven women's shelters. Women in the shelters are provided with training in literacy skills and vocational classes, as well as given sessions with their counsellors and/or lawyers, and their families. When these counselling sessions do not help in resolving their problem, WAW offers legal services on behalf of these women to file for divorce. Their children enter WAW's kindergartens, where they are given basic education.

Women in Afghanistan have built houses for women as shelters in most of the provinces in Afghanistan such as in Kabul, Kapisa, Mazar-e-Sharif, Kunduz, Faryab, and Saripul. The vision of the organization is to enhance the potential individuality of women, self-determination, participating in the social activities such as politics, cultural reforms, social development, economic, and marketing. The organization challenges the norms those undermine woman's rights and violate their freedom. The organization's work encapsulates religion and cultural context in order to accomplish its mission. One of the main goals of the organization is to establish a shelter for women in every province in the country and they are almost well into their way. The organization is mainly worried about the presence of the foreign troops in the country, which increases the Taliban violence. Women in this organization's shelter take literacy classes in order to enhance their reading and writing abilities. In addition, women in the program stay in the program between two weeks and two years, but sometimes some women stay in the program for a prolonged time due to their need of help. Children enter the organization's kindergarten to learn reading, writing, doing art, sing songs, and playing games. Due to the presence of the organization's shelter, it is possible that those kids will have a better future. Women for Afghan Women uses the Bill of Afghan women in order to implement women's right and meets the needs of woman in Afghanistan. The Bill of Rights was signed by the president of Afghanistan Hamid Karzai and it was handed to all women who participated the third annual conference of the organization.

Children’s support centre 
Provisions for Afghan girls and women are poor, regardless of intensive efforts to broaden their freedom, rights, and prominence of life. In 2012, Afghanistan was nominated for being the most dangerous country that a girl can be born in.  Afghanistan has much deprivation and unattainable health care. This was mainly caused by decades of civil war and a sustainable economy made it difficult for women to live there. In Afghanistan, women are jailed together with their children. WAW's Children's Support Center (CSC) raises money to get children out of prison. WAW provides a learning program that helps uneducated children meet the criteria for entrance into local schools, in addition to individual and group therapy. Afghan women are usually afraid of confirming the mistreatment that they face every day in their lives. WAW's biggest projects is to give these women a voice, and to build the self-esteem of Afghan women who are used to burying their emotions and their opinions. Ten percent of the Afghan women receive this aid, and can express their opinions in front of millions of  people.

Halfway houses 
To develop a complete program that helps both women and children, halfway houses serve them when they are out of the prison and shelter. When these women and children have no home to return to, Halfway houses allow women to learn a vocation, literacy, financial and other life skills in preparation for their independent futures. WAW provides a closure by finding these women employment and a roof over their head when they are independent and ready to move out the protected place. Women in shelters often have the same problem. They turn the women literate by providing computers, so they can learn reading and writing skills. WAW prepares women for their individual future. This organization makes sure that women living in the center have a job and place to live when they leave the center. This organization also hopes to build halfway houses to everywhere they have an office.

References

External links 

 

Women's organisations based in Afghanistan
2001 establishments in Afghanistan